Laura Tach is an American professor of policy analysis and management and sociology at Cornell University. She is the co-director with Rachel Dunifon of Cornell Project 2Gen, a research initiative supporting disadvantaged caregivers and children. In collaboration with the Cornell Cooperative Extension of Tompkins County, Tach studies the relationship between opioid abuse and child maltreatment. The study was funded by a multi-year grant from the William T. Grant Foundation. Tach has studied the relationship between "microenvironments", or the neighborhood blocks where one resides, affect educational success.

Selected publications

References

External links

Cornell Project 2Gen

Living people
American sociologists
American women sociologists
American women social scientists
Cornell University faculty
Year of birth missing (living people)
21st-century American women